The 2008 Columbia Lions football team was an American football team that represented Columbia University during the 2008 NCAA Division I FCS football season. Columbia tied for second-to-last in the Ivy League. Columbia averaged 3,827 fans per game.

In their third season under head coach Norries Wilson, the Lions compiled a 2–8 record and were outscored 245 to 171. Mike Brune, Jordan Davis and Drew Quinn were the team captains.  

The Lions' 2–5 conference record placed them in a tie with Cornell for sixth in the Ivy League standings. Columbia was outscored 172 to 122 by Ivy opponents. 

Columbia played its homes games at Robert K. Kraft Field at Lawrence A. Wien Stadium in Upper Manhattan, in New York City.

Schedule

References

Columbia
Columbia Lions football seasons
Columbia Lions football